Apollodorus was a governor, or satrap, of Susiana. He was appointed to this office by the ruler Antiochus III the Great, after the rebellion of his general Molon and his brother Alexander had been put down, in 220 BCE.

Notes

3rd-century BC Greek people
Seleucid satraps
History of Khuzestan Province